Noam Enbar (born 1978 in Tel Aviv) is a singer, composer, songwriter, artistic director, music producer, band and chorus leader, film and theater composer and teacher/mentor. He is the founder of the Israeli post-rock band Habiluim, the Klezmer-Punk band Oy Division and the Great Gehenna Choir.

Music career

Habiluim 
In 1996 Enbar started the group Habiluim, together with guitarist Yami Weissler. The two wrote the lyrics and composed music for all of the group's songs, some together and some apart. Enbar was the lead vocalist and bass guitar player. The group put out three studio albums between the years 2003–2013 ("Habiluim" in 2003, "Bereavement and Failure" in 2007 and "Escalation Hora!" in 2013). Even though the band stopped being active after its last album it has never officially disbanded.

Oy Division 
In 2006 Enbar joined a group of friends to put together the Klezmer ensemble Oy Division. Enbar was the lead vocalist and composed songs to Yiddish texts. The ensemble put out two albums with Enbar ("Oy Division" and "The Internazional", 2008) and performed at festivals worldwide.

Music for Film and Theatre 
Between 2007 and 2016 Enbar collaborated with the director Avi Mugrabi on three films: "z32" (Venice Film Festival 2008) which tells the real-life story of a soldier sent to act out a revenge. "Once I entered a Garden" (Rome Film Festival 2012) which tells the story of the teacher Ali Al-Azhari from the village Sepphoris. "Between Fences" (Berlin Film Festival 2016) which is about a theatre workshop that was held in joint with asylum seekers from Eritrea and Sudan while being held at the detention camp "Holot" in southern Israel. Enbar composed the music for the films and took part in the production and script writing. Enbar's collaboration with Mugrabi also brought "The Details", a sound-video exhibition. The work was put up as part of the debut at the Berlin Film Festival in 2012 and later at the "White Nights" in Paris in 2013 and at the Open City Doc Fest in London in 2014.

In 2017 at the Berlinale Forum Expanded Enbar presented his work "Pana Hageshem" ("The Rain is Gone"). This structured-improvisatory composition devised by Enbar was performed in collaboration with the workshop participants from "Between Fences". It takes a famous Israeli agricultural song, associated with the Kibbutz movement, turning it into an expressive polyphonic chant.

Enbar took part in two pieces for stage art with the poet and playwright Yonatan Levi: "The general and the Sea" (2014), a momentous piece for a choir and single actor which tells the story of Rafael Eitan, and "Giants (Ne'filim)" (Israel Festival 2016), a grim trilogy spanning three decades of Israeli cultural history.

Choral Music and Performance 
In 2012 Enbar put on the show "Sleep Inducement" ("Hardama") at the Israel Museum. Audience members where reclined on mattresses and lulled with dream-inducing surreal songs in Hebrew, Arabic, Yiddish, Polish, English and Armenian. "Sleep Inducement" was premiered in 2012 at the Israeli Museum, followed by the 2013 "Home Festival", Jerusalem.

In 2014 as part of the Jerusalem Season of Culture Enbar put on the show "Psychomysticism!" together with Guitarist Adam Shaflan and Drummer Ariel Armoni. In "Psychomysticism!" Enbar melded psychedelic rock and classic Jewish Hazanut music. He especially incorporated pieces by Pierre Pinchik.

In 2015, together with director Nir Shauluf, Enbar produced "GHOM! A Gibberish Cantata" at Techtonics Festival in Tel Aviv. "GHOM! A Gibberish Cantata" is a liturgic piece for six singers and an 11-year-old solo singer. The gibberish texts were put together by the poet Yonatan Levi.

In 2015 Enbar founded "The Great Gehenna Choir", dedicated to experimenting with egalitarian, democratic forms of artistic practice, as joined decision-making and changing conductors from within the choir itself. The choir put together singers from different backgrounds. Enbar composed the music for the choir from texts by poets such as Lewis Carroll, Aharon Shabtai, and Yonatan Levi. After two years of performing the choir became a cooperative collective.

In 2017 Enbar opened his solo exhibition "Preaching to the Choir" ("Sharim BaKikar") at the Tel Aviv Museum of Art. The exhibition showed for six months and contained works for singers and participatory events. In this project Enbar also cooperated with Eurovision Song Contest winner Netta Barzilai.

In 2017, Enbar put on his piece "Ra'am" for ensemble of drummers commissioned by Basis Academy of the Arts, Herzliya. This was a site specific, durational piece, created in collaboration with light-designer Omer Shezaf, embedding itself in the tower-like architecture of Basis Academy.

In 2018 and 2019, Enbar's piece for a large choir "Blindshigt" ("Atzum") was presented at Mekudeshet festival in Jerusalem.

See also
Music of Israel

References 

Living people
1978 births
Israeli musicians